The Most Revd Arturo Duque Villegas (27 November 1899 – 26 July 1977) was Roman Catholic Archbishop of Manizales in Colombia from 1959 to 1975.

See also 

 Episcopal Conference of Colombia
 Manizales
 Monsignor

References

External links 
 www.catholic-hierarchy.org
 Who's Who in Latin America (1951)

1899 births
1977 deaths
People from Medellín
20th-century Roman Catholic archbishops in Colombia
Participants in the Second Vatican Council
Roman Catholic bishops of Ibagué